The Church of Saint Barbara in  is a Catholic church in Belarus built in 1620. It is currently listed as part of the cultural heritage of Belarus.

The church was built with donations from the local nobleman Andrej Samuil Vinki-Ratomski. According to some historians, at first it belonged to the Calvinists, but was re-consecrated in the aftermath of the January Uprising.

References

Sources 

Churches in Belarus
Landmarks in Belarus